Sebastian "Seb" Morris (born 30 November 1995) is a professional racing driver from Marford, who lives in Chester, Cheshire. He won the 2017 British GT Championship. He also won the 2017 Sunoco Challenge which gave him the prize drive in the Number 31 Whelen Engineering Racing Cadillac DPi at the Rolex 24 hours at Daytona. He led the race for three hours in his stint. Earlier in his career, Morris was a member of the Caterham F1 Academy and was selected by Jack Wills as a Young Brit for their 2013/14 Autumn / Winter campaign.

Career

Ginetta Juniors

Morris began his motorsport career in 2007 when he competitively raced karts. He progressed to Ginetta Juniors in 2010 where he raced for Hillspeed and became the youngest ever podium finisher. Morris then followed this by competing in and winning the winter series at 14 years old. In the following season, 2011, Morris again raced for Hillspeed and won the Ginetta Junior Championship by winning eleven races out of the twenty rounds. In this year he was also awarded the Welsh Young Driver of the Year accolade.

Formula Renault BARC

In 2012 Morris moved into single seater racing in the British Formula Renault Championship driving for the Fortec Motorsport team where he finished the season as the highest placed rookie and third overall. Morris then followed this with racing in and becoming the 2012 Winter Series Champion. Also during 2012 Morris was selected as a member of the Motor Sports Association Academy and also named a British Racing Drivers' Club Rising Star.

In addition Sky Sports F1 invited Morris to take part in a dedicated documentary called Britain's Next F1 Star which gave a behind the scenes look at his life as a teenager, a student and a racing driver.

Formula 4

For the 2013 season Morris raced in the inaugural BRDC Formula 4 Championship for the Hillspeed team where he continued to demonstrate his race craft and speed to finish the season as Vice Champion with 1 race win and 9 podiums. As a result, Morris was selected as a finalist in the McLaren Autosport BRDC Award. Morris's talent was further recognised as he was featured in the Prodigies section of the first edition of the Formula magazine.

Morris was then signed by the Caterham F1 team as a member of their racing academy.

Formula Renault NEC

Morris has again teamed up with Fortec Motorsport to race in the 2014 Formula Renault 2.0 NEC season.

GP3 Series

On 9 March 2015, Morris was confirmed as a driver for Status Grand Prix and made his debut in the 2015 season.

British GT

For 2016 it was decided that Morris would move from single seaters to sportscars, with various opportunities available it was decided he would race a Bentley GT3 for Team Parker Racing in the 2016 British GT Championship series. Securing pole position at his first GT event at Brands Hatch followed by further pole positions at Oulton Park, Silverstone and Spa-Francorchamps and a fastest lap at Oulton Park which is also a GT3 lap record.

In 2017, Morris won the title in the very last race. Morris and his teammate Parfitt won at Rockingham, Silverstone, and Brands Hatch. They also secured pole position at four of the seven events. Morris also set the lap record at Spa-Francorchamps.

IMSA
Morris is currently racing for Action Express in the 2017 IMSA WeatherTech SportsCar Championship opening round, the 24 Hours of Daytona. The Number 31 car finished 6th overall after suffering electrical problems during the 24-hour race.

Morris was announced as a BRDC Super Star in February 2017.

Personal life
Morris was privately educated at Abbey Gate College and King's School, Chester. In 2018, he participated in the fourth season of Celebs Go Dating.

Racing record

Career summary

Complete GP3 Series results
(key) (Races in bold indicate pole position) (Races in italics indicate fastest lap)

Complete British GT Championship results
(key) (Races in bold indicate pole position) (Races in italics indicate fastest lap)

References

http://www.channel4.com/programmes/celebs-go-dating
http://www.imsa.com/sites/default/files/event-weekends/2017/emedit_event_weekend/em_rolex_24_at_daytona/2017_iwsc_rolex24_postsafetycheck_entrylist.pdf
http://www.driverdb.com/drivers/seb-morris/
http://www.brdc.co.uk/Seb-Morris
https://www.youtube.com/watch?v=VPli53S_A8g
Sky Sports F1 Britain's Next F1 Star – part 1
Sky Sports F1 Britain's Next F1 Star – part 2
Autosport Show Interview
BBC Radio Leicester Interview
Sky Sports F1 article – Caterham F1 sign Seb Morris
Formula 4 season
Interview for caledonista
Bella Howard images of Morris from Jack Wills photoshoot
Ginetta news article
Fortec Motorsports NEC page

External links
 
 

1995 births
Living people
Sportspeople from Wrexham
Welsh racing drivers
Formula Renault 2.0 NEC drivers
Formula Renault 2.0 Alps drivers
FIA Institute Young Driver Excellence Academy drivers
GP3 Series drivers
WeatherTech SportsCar Championship drivers
British GT Championship drivers
Ginetta Junior Championship drivers
24H Series drivers
Porsche Carrera Cup GB drivers
Formula Renault BARC drivers
Blancpain Endurance Series drivers
International GT Open drivers
ADAC GT Masters drivers
Fortec Motorsport drivers
Status Grand Prix drivers
Action Express Racing drivers
GT4 European Series drivers
M-Sport drivers